The Hotel is a fly-on-the-wall British television documentary series which ran for four series consisting of 33 episodes. It has been broadcast on Channel 4 since 17 April 2011.

Format
Unlike Hotel, a 1997 BBC docu-soap that offered similar backstage access to the Adelphi Hotel in Liverpool, the series is filmed using fixed cameras positioned in several locations around the complex rather than using a camera crew.

The second and third series of the show were broadcast in the 8pm slot on Sundays on Channel 4, and featured the same hotel, The Grosvenor Hotel in Torquay run by Mark Jenkins.

On 25 May 2014 it was confirmed the show had been commissioned for a fourth series at The Grosvenor's rival hotel, The Cavendish. Mark Jenkins appears in the show as Entertainment Manager; he worked at The Cavendish for five weeks throughout the summer of 2014. The fourth series began airing on 28 December 2014 on Channel 4 in the 8pm slot. The final episode in the series, on 15 February 2015, however, aired in the 7pm slot.

Transmission and production
Series 1 consisting of eight episodes, was filmed at the Damson Dene Hotel in the Lake District over five weeks in the summer of 2010. It was first broadcast in 2011. The second series was filmed at the Grosvenor Hotel in Torquay, owned by manager Mark Jenkins. The second series ran from Sunday 1 January 2012 and aired until 26 February 2012 with 8 episodes and The Hotel at Christmas episode. Due to the popularity of the second series, a third series, also filmed at the Grosvenor Hotel, began on 30 December 2012 and also consisted of 8 episodes. These episodes were filmed throughout the summer of 2012 and as featured in the last episode of the third series, Mark Jenkins sold The Grosvenor to the Richardson Hotel Group.

In May 2014, a fourth series was commissioned by Channel 4. This was filmed in The Cavendish Hotel in Torquay throughout July and August 2014 and saw Mark Jenkins being employed by The Cavendish for five weeks throughout the summer season as their new entertainments manager. The series of eight episodes commenced on 28 December 2014 and concluded on 15 February 2015.

Episodes

Transmissions

Series 1 (2011)
Series One consisted of eight episodes and was set at The Damson Dene Hotel in the Lake District.

Series 2 (2012)
Series Two consisted of nine episodes and was set at The Grosvenor Hotel in Torquay.

* Episode 9 was a Christmas themed episode entitled The Hotel at Christmas.

Series 3 (2012–2013)
Series Three consisted of eight episodes filmed again at the Grosvenor Hotel and was announced after the success of Series Two earlier in 2012.  It saw the owner, Mark Jenkins selling the hotel to The Richardson Group at the end of the series.

Series 4 (2014–2015)
The fourth series of The Hotel began airing on 28 December 2014 on Channel 4. It sees Mark Jenkins, former owner of The Grosvenor Hotel, becoming an entertainment manager for The Cavendish Hotel for one summer season; located opposite The Grosvenor, a few metres down the road.

References

External links

2011 British television series debuts
2015 British television series endings
Business-related television series in the United Kingdom
Channel 4 documentary series
English-language television shows
Hospitality industry in the United Kingdom
Television series by Endemol
Television series set in hotels
Television shows set in Devon
Television shows set in the Lake District